The men's large hill individual ski jumping competition for the 1988 Winter Olympics was held in Canada Olympic Park. It occurred on 23 February.

Results

References

Ski jumping at the 1988 Winter Olympics